Abigail Dillen is an environmental lawyer and executive at the environmental justice organization Earthjustice. Her work has been called "precedent setting" by multiple climate organizations. This includes, for example, defending the roadless rule. She was profiled as a 2020 changemaker by Marie Claire.

Dillen has a Juris Doctor degree from UC Berkeley School of Law and joined in Earthjustice in 2000.  She led both the clean energy and coal programs at Earthjustice. She became the chief executive in 2018 replacing Trip Van Noppen.

Dillen was a contributor in the All We Can Save anthology. She has also published opinion pieces for USA Today, Huffington Post, The Hill, EcoWatch and other  news sources.

Personal life 
Dillen grew up in New Mexico. She is married to architect Jasmit Rangr, and has a son.

References 

Living people
American environmental lawyers
UC Berkeley School of Law alumni
Year of birth missing (living people)
American women business executives
American women lawyers
21st-century American women